The Myakka State Forest is in the U.S. state of Florida. The  forest is located on the southwest coast, in North Port.

See also
List of Florida state forests
List of Florida state parks

References and external links

 Myakka State Forest: Florida Division of Forestry- FDACS

Florida state forests
Protected areas of Sarasota County, Florida
North Port, Florida